"Way Too Far" is a song written and recorded by American nu metal band Korn. It was released as the third single from Korn's tenth studio album, The Path of Totality, on March 6, 2012. The single features production and additional music by 12th Planet, Flinch, and Downlink. And it was also the last Korn single recorded as a quartet before original guitarist Brian Welch returned to the band the following year.

Background and composition
Jonathan Davis explained the song's meaning:

Release
"Way Too Far" was released to active rock and heritage rock radio stations without an official impact date sometime in March 2012. It debuted and peaked at number 38 on the United States Billboard Mainstream Rock chart, failing to match the success of the album's first two singles. The song was inducted into the Loudwire Cage Match Hall of Fame after Internet users voted for it over various other songs five days in a row, beating songs by Slash, Demon Hunter, Pennywise, Metallica, and Hollywood Undead.

Music video
The music video for "Way Too Far" premiered on May 7, 2012, and was directed by Joshua Allen, who also directed the previous music video for "Chaos Lives in Everything". Unlike the previous videos, this video was conceptual and its concept features each band member taking things 'way too far'. Jonathan Davis's alter-ego, JDevil, makes an appearance in the video.

Formats and track listings
 CD single (United States)
 "Way Too Far" (radio edit) – 3:23

Charts

References

Korn songs
2012 singles
2011 songs
Roadrunner Records singles
Songs written by Reginald Arvizu
Songs written by Jonathan Davis
Songs written by James Shaffer
Industrial metal songs
Dubstep songs